The Men's artistic team competition at the 2015 Southeast Asian Games was held on 6 June 2015 at the Bishan Sports Hall in Singapore. The competition is divided to 2 subdivisions. The first subdivision took place at 09:00 Singapore Standard Time (UTC+8); followed by the second at 15:00 respectively.

The team competition also served as qualification for the individual all-around and event finals.

Schedule
All times are Singapore Standard Time (UTC+8).

Results

Qualification results

Individual all-around

Floor

Pommel horse

Rings

Vault

Parallel bars

High bar

References

External links
 
 

Men's artistic team